The first American Basketball Association All-Star Game was played on January 9, 1968, at Hinkle Fieldhouse in Indianapolis, Indiana, before an audience of 10,872. Jim Pollard (Minnesota Muskies) coached the Eastern Conference team, while Babe McCarthy (New Orleans Buccaneers) coached the West.

Mel Daniels helped take the East team to victory by leading all players with 22 points and 15 rebounds, but Larry Brown of the losing West squad was named MVP. Joe Belmont and Ron Feiereisel officiated the game.

Western Conference

Eastern Conference
 

Halftime — East, 61-59
Third Quarter — East, 92-91

References

External links 
 ABA All Star Game at RemembertheABA.com

All-Star
ABA All-star game
ABA All-star game